Carlos Hounié Fleurquin (10 November 1906 – 1962) was a Uruguayan chess player, two-time Uruguayan Chess Championship winner (1935, 1946).

Biography
From the early 1930s to the end 1940s, Carlos Hounié Fleurquin was one of Uruguayan leading chess players. He was multiple participant in the Uruguayan Chess Championships, where he won champion title in 1935 and 1946.
He was participant in three South American Chess Championships in row (1934, 1934/1935, 1936). Also Carlos Hounié Fleurquin was participant of a number of major international tournaments: Montevideo (1939, 1961), Mar del Plata (1945, 1947).

Carlos Hounié Fleurquin played for Uruguay in the Chess Olympiad:
 In 1939, at second board in the 8th Chess Olympiad in Buenos Aires (+8, =3, -5).

References

External links

Hounié Fleurquin chess games at 365chess.com

1906 births
1962 deaths
Uruguayan chess players
Chess Olympiad competitors
20th-century chess players